Riederich is a town in the district of Reutlingen in Baden-Württemberg in Germany. It is about 30 km away from Stuttgart and has a population of 4300.

References